Medical Council is the name of the regulatory body that grants medical licenses in many countries. Specifically, it may refer to:

 Australian Medical Council, a national standards advisory body for medical education and mental health medication and education
 General Medical Council, the regulator of the medical profession in the United Kingdom
 Medical Council of Ireland, the regulator of the medical profession in the Republic of Ireland
 Medical Council of Canada, an examining body in Canada
 Medical Council of India, a constitutional body in India set up primarily to establish uniform standards of higher qualifications in medicine
 Medical Council of Iran, the licensing and regulatory body for Iranian healthcare professionals 
 Medical Council of Jamaica, a licensing body in Jamaica
 Medical Council of New Zealand
 Medical Council of Thailand, a national standards advisory body for medical education and training, and regulator of the medical profession at the same time
 Pakistan Medical & Dental Council
 Singapore Medical Council, one of the statutory boards of the Singapore Government
 Sri Lanka Medical Council

See also
 Medical Research Council (disambiguation)